is a railway station in Ebetsu, Hokkaidō, Japan. The station is numbered A10.

Lines
Toyohoro Station is served by the Hakodate Main Line.

Station layout
The station consists of two ground-level opposed side platforms serving two tracks. The station has automated ticket machines and Kitaca card readers. The station is unattended.

Platforms

Adjacent stations

References

Railway stations in Hokkaido Prefecture
Railway stations in Japan opened in 1956